The enzyme isoprene synthase (EC 4.2.3.27) catalyzes the chemical reaction

 prenyl pyrophosphate  isoprene + diphosphate

This enzyme belongs to the family of lyases, specifically those carbon-oxygen lyases acting on phosphates. The systematic name of this enzyme class is prenyl-diphosphate diphosphate-lyase (isoprene-forming). Other names in common use include ISPC, and ISPS.

References

 
 
 
 
 
 
 
 
 
 
 

EC 4.2.3
Enzymes of unknown structure